Jason Frerichs is a state senator from South Dakota, currently serving as the Democratic Party's minority leader.

Early life and education
Frerichs graduated from South Dakota State University in 2007, earning a B.S. in Agriculture Education. He is the president of the Roberts County Farmers Union. He lives in Wilmot, South Dakota. Frerichs owns and works on a farm with his father and brothers, and also manages 150 cows. Frerichs teaches agriculture at Lake Area Technical Institute, and is an FFA adviser.

Frerichs father, grandfather, and great-grandfather all served in the South Dakota House of Representatives. Frerichs served as a page in both the South Dakota legislature and the United States Senate, working for Senator Tom Daschle.

Political career
Frerichs served in the South Dakota State House of Representatives from 2008 to 2010, where he was the minority whip. In 2010, he was elected to the state senate, becoming minority leader. Frerichs is a member of the Agriculture and Natural Resources Committee, the Legislative Procedure Committee, and the State Affairs. In 2010, Frerichs defeated fellow state senator Eldon Nygaard in the race for senate minority leader; Nygaard switched to the Republican Party shortly after.

Frerichs advocates the development of renewable energy in South Dakota. He ist considered to be a member of the moderate wing of the South Dakota Democrats and an ally of former Representative Stephanie Herseth Sandlin.

References

External links
JasonFrerichs.com
Frerichs's Twitter account

Living people
Members of the South Dakota House of Representatives
South Dakota state senators
South Dakota State University alumni
1984 births
21st-century American politicians